Sir James Grant, 6th Baronet (28 July 1679 – 16 January 1747) was a Scottish Whig politician who sat in the House of Commons for 25 years from 1722 to 1747. He was Chief of Clan Grant from 1719 until his death.

Early life
Grant was the third, but second surviving son of Ludovick Grant of Freuchie and Grant. He was educated at Elgin. He married on 29 January 1702, Anne Colquhoun, daughter of Sir Humphrey Colquhoun, 5th Baronet, of Luss, Dunbarton. Grant became heir of entail to his father-in-law’s estate and baronetcy by a patent executed in 1704. In 1718, upon succeeding to the baronetcy, he became, Sir James Colquhoun of Luss. In 1719 on the death of his brother Alexander, he succeeded as Clan Chief and to the Grant estates, whereupon he reverted to his family name of Grant, keeping the title of baronet. He passed the Colquhoun inheritance by the entail to his second son Ludovick. On 24 June 1721 he was created Lord Grant in the Jacobite peerage by James Francis Edward Stuart in an attempt by the exiled Old Pretender secure the support of Clan Grant.

Career
At the 1722 Grant was returned as Member of Parliament for Inverness-shire on his family’s interest. He consistently voted with the Administration and was returned unopposed again in 1727. His only reported speech was made on 5 May 1732, asking for leniency for a relative, Sir Archibald Grant. He was returned again in 1734. At the 1741 general election, he transferred to Elgin Burghs, continuing to vote with the Government. 

He was in Scotland when Charles Edward Stuart landed in Scotland to initiate the Jacobite rising of 1745, but after a meeting with clan members at Castle Grant, he decided to go south to London. Grant advised his son ‘to stay at home, take care of his country and join no party’. He sent two notes to Henry Pelham, suggesting the formation of an army based on clansmen from among the loyal clans, and forwarded an unopened letter from the Young Pretender to Lord Tweeddale, the secretary of state for Scotland.

Death and legacy
Grant died on 16 January 1747. He and his wife had six sons and eight daughters. His eldest son Ludovick was a commissioner of police and succeeded to the baronetcy.  His second son was a captain in the army. His fourth, and third, surviving son was Lieutenant-General Francis Grant (1717-1781).

References

1679 births
1747 deaths
British MPs 1727–1734
British MPs 1734–1741
British MPs 1741–1747
Members of the Parliament of Great Britain for Scottish constituencies
Baronets in the Baronetage of Nova Scotia
Lords of Parliament in the Jacobite peerage
Scottish clan chiefs